The thirteenth season of The Real Housewives of Orange County, an American reality television series, is broadcast on Bravo. It aired from July 16, 2018, until December 9, 2018, and is primarily filmed in Orange County, California. Its executive producers are Adam Karpel, Alex Baskin, Douglas Ross, Gregory Stewart, Scott Dunlop, Stephanie Boyriven and Andy Cohen.

The thirteenth season of The Real Housewives of Orange County focuses on the lives of Vicki Gunvalson, Tamra Judge, Shannon Beador, Kelly Dodd, Gina Kirschenheiter and Emily Simpson.

This season marked the final regular appearance of Vicki Gunvalson, making her the last original housewife of the series to depart.

Cast and synopsis
Following the conclusion of the twelfth season, Meghan King Edmonds, Lydia McLaughlin and Peggy Sulahian left the show. For the thirteenth season, Vicki Gunvalson, Tamra Judge, Shannon Beador and Kelly Dodd all returned to the series, with Gina Kirschenheiter and Emily Simpson joining the cast.

Episodes

References

External links

 
 
 

2018 American television seasons
Orange County (season 13)